= Chicago School of Architecture =

Chicago School of Architecture may refer to:

- Chicago school (architecture), an architectural aesthetic associated with the city of Chicago
- Chicago School of Architecture, founded by Louis Millet at the Art Institute of Chicago
